The 1977-1978 FIRA Trophy was the 18th edition of a European rugby union championship for national teams.

The tournament was won by France, with a Grand Slam. Romania finished in 2nd place, while Spain had a surprising 3rd place, defeating Italy (10-3), in Madrid, to repeat the same place of the previous tournament. Italy had a very disappointing performance, finishing in 5th place, below Poland, who also beat them (12-6).

First Division 
Table

 relegated to division 2

Results

Second Division

Pool 1 
Table

Results

Pool 2 
Table

Results

Finals 

Soviet Union promoted to division 1

Bibliography 
 Francesco Volpe, Valerio Vecchiarelli (2000), 2000 Italia in Meta, Storia della nazionale italiana di rugby dagli albori al Sei Nazioni, GS Editore (2000) .
 Francesco Volpe, Paolo Pacitti (Author), Rugby 2000, GTE Gruppo Editorale (1999).

References

External links
 FIRA-AER official website

1977–78 in European rugby union
1977-78
1977 rugby union tournaments for national teams
1978 rugby union tournaments for national teams